John Martin Miller (August 31, 1882 – March 31, 1952) was an American entomologist who worked in the Bureau of Entomology in the U.S. Department of Agriculture from 1911 to 1936. He was in charge of the Forest Insect Laboratory at Berkeley from 1928 to 1942, and was known for his research on bark beetles in forests of the western United States. Born in Parlier, California, he graduated from Stanford University with a degree in Zoology in 1908. He died March 31, 1952, in Mexico City, while working as Consulting Entomologist with the Mexican government through the United Nations Food and Agriculture Organization.

Select works

References

1882 births
1952 deaths
American entomologists
People from Parlier, California
Stanford University School of Humanities and Sciences alumni
United States Department of Agriculture people
20th-century American zoologists
Coleopterists